William Archibald Robertson (1832 – June 23, 1926) was a prospector and Scottish-born political figure in British Columbia. He represented Victoria District in the Legislative Assembly of British Columbia from 1874 to 1875.

He was born in Perthshire, the son of Alexander Robertson, and came to Upper Canada in 1834 with his family. His family lived in Dunnville, then Toronto and finally Flamboro West. In 1862, Robertson joined the Union Army in the United States. After he was captured and paroled, he resigned his commission and moved to British Columbia, settling in Victoria. He was elected to the assembly in an 1874 by-election held after Arthur Bunster and Amor De Cosmos were elected to the Canadian House of Commons. Robertson was able to locate coal and silver deposits. In 1870, he married Matilda Martha Mayne. He died in Victoria at the age of 93.

References 

1832 births
1926 deaths
Scottish emigrants to pre-Confederation Ontario
Canadian people of the American Civil War
Union Army personnel
American Civil War prisoners of war
Independent MLAs in British Columbia